Java Jive is a song written by Ben Oakland and Milton Drake in 1940 and most famously recorded by The Ink Spots. The lyrics speak of the singer's love of coffee. The lyrics also reflect the slang of the day, including a reference to "Mr. Moto", a Japanese film spy. The Ink Spots' 1940 recording of the song reached #17 on the US Pop charts and is considered by many to be the definitive version. The song is also heard in the 1942 movie In This Our Life. originally featured the couplet "I'm not keen about a bean / Unless it is a 'cheery beery bean", as a pun on the song "Ciribiribin", but the Ink Spots' lead singer inadvertently sang it as "cheery cheery bean", and recordings by subsequent artists have generally either followed suit or changed it to "chili chili bean".

The Manhattan Transfer also performed it on various occasions, including Camera Three (1974), The Mike Douglas Show (1974), The Two Ronnies (1978), and recorded a popular version of the song in 1975.

The song has been extensively recorded over the years, with notable performances by Guy Lombardo and The King Sisters.

References 

1940 songs
Songs with lyrics by Milton Drake